Samuel F. Sears Jr. is a professor of health psychology at East Carolina University (Greenville, NC).

Early life and clinical training 
Sears was born in Orlando, Florida and raised in its surrounding suburbs. He graduated from Lake Brantley High School in 1986 and enrolled at the University of Florida. He was a walk-on football player before incurring multiple injuries. These injuries prompted him to examine the psychological aspects of health and recovery as a psychology major. He further pursued these studies in the Department of Clinical and Health Psychology at the University of Florida, where he obtained his Ph.D. and was later hired onto the faculty. He served as an assistant professor and later as an associate professor for 12 years. During his time at the University of Florida, he established the first cardiac psychology laboratory at that university.

References

External links 
ECU Cardiac Psychology, Samuel Sears
 Sears receives O. Max Gardner award

East Carolina University faculty
Psychology educators
University of Florida College of Liberal Arts and Sciences alumni
University of Florida faculty
Living people
Year of birth missing (living people)
American clinical psychologists